Sorng Rokha Vorn Wildlife Sanctuary is a protected area located in northwest Cambodia created in 2018, covering 30,254 hectares. It is under threat from significant illegal logging and deforestation. Community members attempting to protect the forest in this area and the nearby Prey Lang Wildlife Sanctuary have "see[n] an increase in the number and severity of the threats to the community patrol members. This includes threats to property, family members, threats of arrests by authorities and [threats of] killings".

References

External 
 Map of protected areas in Cambodia

Wildlife sanctuaries of Cambodia
Protected areas of Cambodia
Protected areas established in 2018